Supaksorn Chaimongkol (born December 2, 1982) is a Thai model and actress. Her nickname is Kratae.

She graduate a bachelor of Communication Arts from Rangsit University.

Her film roles include Kunpan: Legend of the Warlord, Art of the Devil and Andaman Girl, all under director Thanit Jitnukul.

In 2007, she starred in the spy-action comedy, Chai Lai, directed by Poj Arnon, and the martial arts drama Brave, featuring Thai stunt actor Pairote Boongerd (Mike B.) and Malaysian comedian Afdlin Shauki. The film started to air in April 2012 in Malaysia.

In 2008, she starred in Handle Me With Care, a romantic drama written and directed by Kongdej Jaturanrasamee.

Filmography

External links

Supaksorn Chaimongkol
Supaksorn Chaimongkol
1982 births
Living people